Corrine Patricia McMillan (born 12 August 1973) is an Australian politician. She has been the Labor member for Mansfield in the Queensland Legislative Assembly since 2017.

References

1973 births
Living people
Members of the Queensland Legislative Assembly
Australian Labor Party members of the Parliament of Queensland
Place of birth missing (living people)
Women members of the Queensland Legislative Assembly
21st-century Australian politicians
21st-century Australian women politicians
Labor Right politicians